625-line (or CCIR 625/50) is a late 1940s European analog standard-definition television resolution standard. It consists of a 625-line raster, with 576 lines carrying the visible image at 25 interlaced frames per second. It was eventually adopted by countries using 50 Hz utility frequency as regular TV broadcasts resumed after World War II. With the introduction of color television in the 1960s, it became associated with the PAL and SECAM analog color systems.

A similar 525-line system was adopted by countries using 60 Hz utility frequency (like the US). Other systems, like 375-line, 405-line, 441-line and 819-line existed, but became outdated or had limited adoption.

The modern standard-definition digital video resolution 576i is equivalent and can be used to digitize an analogue 625-lineTV signal, or to generate a 625-line compatible analog signal.

History 
At the CCIR Stockholm Conference in July 1948 a first 625-line system with a 8 MHz channel bandwidth was proposed by the Soviet Union, based on 1946-48 studies by Mark Iosifovich Krivosheev. This was initially known as the I.B.T.O. 625-line system.

At a CCIR Geneva meeting in July 1950, Dr. Gerber (a Swiss engineer), proposed a modified 625-line system  using a  7 MHz channel bandwidth - informally known as the "Gerber Standard". The system was based on work by Telefunken and Walter Bruch, and was supported by Belgium, Denmark, Italy, Netherlands, Sweden and Switzerland.

At a CCIR Geneva meeting in May 1951, the existing VHF broadcast standards were standardized. The older 405-line system was designated CCIR System A, the Gerber Standard was designated System B, the Belgian variant System C and the I.B.T.O. standard System D.

In the 1960s, with the introduction of UHF broadcasts, new 625-line standards were adopted, again with slightly different broadcast parameters, leading to the creation of Systems G, H, I, K, L and N

Analog broadcast 625-line television standards 
The following International Telecommunication Union standards use 625-lines:

Analog color 625-line television systems 
The following analog television color systems were used in conjunction with the previous standards (identified by a letter after the colour system indication):
 PAL analog color television system (ex: PAL-B, PAL-D, etc.)
 SECAM analog color television system (ex: SECAM-D, SECAM-L, etc.)

Digital video 
625-lines is sometimes mentioned when digitizing analog video, or when outputting digital video in a standard-definition analog compatible format.
 576i, a standard-definition television digital video mode
 PAL region, a common term regarding video games, meaning regions where the 625-lines PAL standard was traditionally used.
 PAL/SECAM DVD
 PAL/SECAM Video CD
 Rec. 601, a 1982  standard for encoding interlaced analog video signals in digital video form.
 D-1 (Sony), a 1986 SMPTE digital recording video standard

See also
 525 lines
 576p

References

Television technology